Leonidas Pelekanakis (2 November 1962 – 14 January 2021) was a Greek sailor. He competed at the 1984 Summer Olympics, the 2000 Summer Olympics, and the 2004 Summer Olympics. Pelekanakis died of COVID-19 during the pandemic in Greece on 14 January 2021, after an almost two-month battle with the illness.

References

External links
 

1962 births
2021 deaths
Greek male sailors (sport)
Olympic sailors of Greece
Sailors at the 1984 Summer Olympics – Star
Sailors at the 2000 Summer Olympics – Star
Sailors at the 2004 Summer Olympics – Star
Place of birth missing
Deaths from the COVID-19 pandemic in Greece
Hellenic Navy personnel
Sailors (sport) from Piraeus